Neoanalthes is a genus of moths of the family Crambidae described by Hiroshi Yamanaka and Valentina A. Kirpichnikova in 1993.

Species
Neoanalthes abludens Du & Li, 2008
Neoanalthes contortalis (Hampson, 1900)
Neoanalthes guangxiensis Du & Li, 2008
Neoanalthes nebulalis Yamanaka & Kirpichnikova, 1993
Neoanalthes pseudocontortalis Yamanaka & Kirpichnikova, 1993
Neoanalthes undatalis Du & Li, 2008
Neoanalthes variabilis Du & Li, 2008
Neoanalthes wangi Du & Li, 2008

References

 Du, X. C. & Li, H. H. (2008). Deutsche Entomologische Zeitschrift. 55 (2): 291-301.

Spilomelinae
Crambidae genera